Half Moon Farm House is a heritage-listed house at Half Moon Road, Mongarlowe, Queanbeyan-Palerang Region, New South Wales, Australia. It was added to the New South Wales State Heritage Register on 2 April 1999.

Heritage listing 
Half Moon Farm House was listed on the New South Wales State Heritage Register on 2 April 1999.

See also

References

Bibliography

Attribution 

New South Wales State Heritage Register
Houses in New South Wales
Articles incorporating text from the New South Wales State Heritage Register